This is a list of regions of Montenegro by Human Development Index as of 2023 with data for the year 2021.

References 

Human Development Index
Ranked lists of country subdivisions